KICA (980 AM) is a radio station broadcasting a Farm & Agriculture format. Licensed to Clovis, New Mexico, the station serves the Clovis-Portales CSA and Amarillo metropolitan area (Amarillo during daytime only). The station is owned by Monte Spearman and Gentry Todd Spearman's High Plains Radio Network, through licensee HPRN Networks LLC. Previously the station was "Rocket 980", with an oldies format.

References

External links

ICA
Clovis, New Mexico